Mihyun Kang is a South Korean mathematician specializing in combinatorics, including graph enumeration and the topological properties of random graphs. She is a professor in the Institute of Discrete Mathematics at the Graz University of Technology.

Education and career
Kang completed a PhD at KAIST, the Korea Advanced Institute of Science and Technology, in 2001. Her dissertation, Random Walks on a Union of Finite Groups, was supervised by Geon Ho Choe.

She became a postdoctoral researcher at the Humboldt University of Berlin from 2001 to 2008, and completed a habilitation there in 2007. From 2008 to 2011 she was funded by the German Research Foundation as a Heisenberg Fellow. After taking an acting professorship at the Ludwig Maximilian University of Munich in 2011, she became a full professor at the Graz University of Technology in 2012. At the same time, she became head of the Institute of Discrete Mathematics at Graz.

Recognition
Kang was a 2019 winner of the Friedrich Wilhelm Bessel Research Prize of the Alexander von Humboldt Foundation.

References

External links
Home page

Year of birth missing (living people)
Living people
21st-century South Korean mathematicians
South Korean women mathematicians
Graph theorists
KAIST alumni
Academic staff of the Graz University of Technology